Sixth Amendment may refer to:

Sixth Amendment to the United States Constitution, part of the Bill of Rights, which sets out rights of the accused in a criminal prosecution
Sixth Amendment of the Constitution of Ireland, ensured that certain adoption orders would not be found to be unconstitutional because they had not been made by a court
Sixth Amendment of the Constitution of South Africa, which altered the structure of the judiciary and made a number of other technical changes
Sixth Amendment to the Constitution of Pakistan, which altered the term and age limits on the judiciary